Josué Andrés Abarca Valverde (born 4 January 2000) is a Costa Rican footballer who plays as a winger for Escorpiones.

Career

Early years
Abarca was born and raised in San Isidro de El General of the canton of Pérez Zeledón, in the southern part of the province of San José in Costa Rica. He started playing football at the age of 10 at the local club Pueblo Nuevo de Cajón FC. After a game against Municipal Pérez Zeledón in 2011, where Abarca scored three goals, he got a call from the club and ended up joining them.

But Abarca did not only caught Pérez Zeledón's interest. Some time later, regional tests of the national team were held in which this attacker stood out and ended up being part of the U-13 team of Costa Rica and later also the U-15.

Carmelita
Abarca joined A.D. Carmelita at the age of 13 from Pérez Zeledón. At the age of 15, Abarca was spotted by Portuguese club FC Porto and invited to a two-week trial. He played four friendly games for the clubs youth team and scored one goal during his trial. However, due to the rules, he had to wait until he was 18 year old, before an eventual transfer. Therefore, he continued to play for Carmelita.

Loan to UCR
In the summer 2016, former Carmelita manager, Guilherme Farinha, brought 16-year old Abarca to UCR on a loan deal for the 2016–17 season. He got his professional debut in the Liga FPD on 17 July 2016 against Carmelita, when he replaced Víctor Gutiérrez in the 82th minute. He made a total of seven league appearances during the loan spell.

Return to Carmelita
Abarca returned to Carmelita in the summer 2017, after playing seven league games for UCR. After returning, he also made his official debut for Carmelita on 1 November 2017 against Guadalupe. That was one out of two appearances he made for Carmelita, before he left the club at the end of 2017.

Desamparados
After leaving Carmelita, Abarca joined Fútbol Consultants Moravia for the 2018. The club was later renamed Fútbol Consultants Desamparados.

On 31 January 2018, Abarca joined Mexican club Santos Laguna on a two-year loan deal. Abarca was registered for the clubs U-20 team. However, he returned to Costa Rica after one year with only playing official games for the Mexican clubs U-20 team. Abarca also played for Santos Laguna's first team in a pre-season friendly game in the United States.

LD Alajuelense
Due to family reasons, Abarca was forced to leave Mexico and return to Costa Rica. After returning, Abarca was signed by LD Alajuelense in January 2019. In April, Abarca got injured during a training session. He fought to get a place on the first team, however, without success and he ended up leaving the club at the end of the year with only one appearance in October 2019 against Municipal Grecia.

Return to Desamparados
For the 2020 season, Abarca returned to Fútbol Consultants Desamparados. However, Abarca still fought to recover from the same injury he got in April 2019.

On 9 June 2021 Desamparados confirmed, that Abarca would play on loan for Guadalupe FC for the next two years until 30 June 2023. However, Guadalupe decided to cancel the loan-spell on 24 October 2021.

Escorpiones
On 28 December 2021, Abarca joined Escorpiones.

International career
Formerly, Abarca was a part of the U-13 and U-15 national teams of Costa Rica. In 2017, Abarca played six games for Costa Rica in the 2017 FIFA U-17 World Cup and in the following year, also six game in the 2018 CONCACAF U-20 Championship.

References

External links
 

Living people
2000 births
Costa Rican men's footballers
Costa Rican expatriate footballers
Costa Rica youth international footballers
Costa Rica under-20 international footballers
Association football forwards
Liga FPD players
A.D. Carmelita footballers
L.D. Alajuelense footballers
Guadalupe F.C. players
People from Puntarenas
Costa Rican expatriate sportspeople in Mexico
Expatriate footballers in Mexico